Charles Roth (October 2, 1946) is a Republican member of the Kansas House of Representatives, representing the 71st district.  He has served after being first appointed February 2, 2005 to 2013.

Roth, a graduate of the University of Kansas, owned Joseph P. Roth and sons from 1968-2005.

He has been long active in the community, including a year as mayor of Salina from 1984-1985.  Additionally he has been a member of the Community Health Investment Program, Salina County Club, Salina United Way Board, and Salina Area Chamber of Commerce.

Committee membership
 Education
 Corrections and Juvenile Justice
 Government Efficiency and Fiscal Oversight

Major donors
The top 5 donors to Roth's 2008 campaign:
1. Kansans for Lifesaving Cures 	$1,000
2. Koch Industries 	$1,000
3. Kansas Assoc of Realtors 	$900 	
4. Wal-Mart 	$800 	
5. Kansas Bankers Assoc 	$800

References

External links
 Official Website
 Kansas Legislature - Charles Roth
 Project Vote Smart profile
 Kansas Votes profile
 State Surge - Legislative and voting track record
 Campaign contributions: 2008

Republican Party members of the Kansas House of Representatives
Living people
University of Kansas alumni
Politicians from Salina, Kansas
1946 births
21st-century American politicians